Erection is the physiological engorgement with blood of the tissue of a penis.

Erection also may refer to:

Physiology
 Clitoral erection
 Nipple erection
 Piloerection, a muscle-effected rising of hair

Other
Construction, erection of a building
 Erection (film), a 1971 short film by John Lennon with music by Yoko Ono
 Gyro erection, the process of spinning up a gyroscopic attitude indicator and aligning it to vertical

See also
 New Erections, 2007 album
 New Erection, Virginia, unincorporated community
 Erectile tissue

Erect (disambiguation)